Wintersville is an unincorporated community in Tulpehocken Township, Berks County, Pennsylvania, United States. It is located on Wintersville Road near Mount Aetna, with which it shares the ZIP Code of 19544.

Unincorporated communities in Berks County, Pennsylvania
Unincorporated communities in Pennsylvania